St. Joachim Roman Catholic Church was the first Roman Catholic church founded in Northeast Philadelphia.

Established in 1845 in the Frankford neighborhood of Philadelphia, the parish was closed on July 1, 2013, part of a wide-ranging re-organization of Catholic parishes in the Philadelphia Archdiocese; it became part of Holy Innocents Parish along with two other, nearby closed parishes, Mater Dolorosa and St. Joan of Arc.

Education
St. Joachim had a parish school, and later Holy Innocents Area Catholic School was its designated Catholic school.

Graveyard
The St. Joachim's Church graveyard is maintained by Holy Innocents.

Former Pastors

Rev. Dominick Forestal
Rev. James O’Kane
Rev. F.X. Villanis
Rev. John M. McGovern
Rev. Nicholas J. Walsh
Rev. John P. Byrne
Rev. Francis P. Fitzmaurice
Rev. John B. Dever
Rev. Thomas McNally
Rev. James A Donnelly
Rev. Francis A. Fagan
Rev. William Cotterall
Rev. Anthony F. Silvestri, OSFS
Rev. Thomas Palko, OSFS
Rev. Eugene J. McBride, OSFS
Rev. Robert L. Bazzoli, OSFS
Rev. Steven P. Wetzel, OSFS

See also

 Roman Catholic Archdiocese of Philadelphia

References

Further reading

External links

Holy Innocents School

Roman Catholic churches in Philadelphia
Roman Catholic churches in Pennsylvania
Religious organizations established in 1845
Roman Catholic Archdiocese of Philadelphia
19th-century Roman Catholic church buildings in the United States
Irish-American culture in Philadelphia
1845 establishments in Pennsylvania
Frankford, Philadelphia